Henry Barksdale "Puss" Redd (January 22, 1895 – January 1, 1960) was head football coach at Virginia Agricultural and Mechanical College and Polytechnic Institute (VPI)—now Virginia Tech—from 1932 to 1940. He also served as the school's men's basketball head coach for one season in 1926–27. Redd played college football for Tech in 1916 and 1917 before entering active service in World War I as a lieutenant in the artillery. He reentered school after the war and played again on the 1919 and 1920 teams, serving as captain for the 1920 season.  He graduated in 1921.   He was inducted into the Virginia Tech Sports Hall of Fame in 1985.

Head coaching record

Football

References

1895 births
1960 deaths
American football fullbacks
Virginia Tech Hokies football players
Virginia Tech Hokies football coaches
Virginia Tech Hokies men's basketball coaches
American military personnel of World War I
Basketball coaches from Virginia
United States Army officers
People from Martinsville, Virginia
Players of American football from Virginia